Ayomide Temilade Oluwatoyosi Folorunso (born 17 October 1996) is an Italian athlete specialising in the 400 metres hurdles. She competed in the 4 × 400 metres relay at the 2015 World Championships in Beijing.

Biography
Her family is originally from Nigeria, but since 2004 Ayomide has settled with her parents, mother Mariam and father Emmanuel, a mining geologist, in Fidenza. She failed to wear the azzurro at the 2013 World Youth Championships in Athletics despite having obtained the minimum in five specialties, because she received her Italian passport a few days after the world championship, therefore she is member of the Italy national athletics team.

National records
 4x400 metres relay indoor: 3:31.55 Birmingham, England, 4 March 2018) - current holder with Chiara Bazzoni, Raphaela Lukudo, Maria Enrica Spacca

Achievements

1Did not finish in the final

Personal bests
Outdoor
100 metres: 11.83 (+0.5 m/s) – Rubiera, Italy, 13 September 2016
200 metres: 23.53 (+0.7 m/s) – Casalmaggiore, Italy, 12 September 2016
400 metres: 52.25 – Modena, Italy, 5 May 2016
400 metres hurdles: 54.60 – Rieti, Italy, 26 June 2022

Indoor
200 metres: 23.86 – Padua, Italy, 2016
400 metres: 52.97 – Madrid, Spain, 2017

National titles
Italian Athletics Championships
400 metres hurdles: 2016, 2019
Italian Athletics Indoor Championships
400 metres: 2016, 2017, 2020

See also
 List of Italian records in athletics
 Italian all-time lists - 400 metres hurdles
 Italian national track relay team
 Naturalized athletes of Italy
 List of eligibility transfers in athletics

References

External links
 

1996 births
Living people
Italian female sprinters
Italian female hurdlers
Italian Athletics Championships winners
Italian sportspeople of African descent
Athletes (track and field) at the 2016 Summer Olympics
Athletes (track and field) at the 2018 Mediterranean Games
Athletics competitors of Fiamme Oro
Medalists at the 2017 Summer Universiade
Medalists at the 2019 Summer Universiade
Mediterranean Games gold medalists for Italy
Mediterranean Games silver medalists for Italy
Mediterranean Games medalists in athletics
Naturalised citizens of Italy
Nigerian emigrants to Italy
Olympic athletes of Italy
Sportspeople from Abeokuta
Universiade medalists in athletics (track and field)
Universiade gold medalists for Italy
Universiade gold medalists in athletics (track and field)
World Athletics Championships athletes for Italy
21st-century Italian women